Jonathan Moss (born 18 October 1970) is an English former football referee who officiated primarily in the Premier League having been promoted to the Select Group of Referees in 2011. He is currently the Select Group 1 Manager at the PGMOL

He was born in Sunderland but is now based in Horsforth, West Yorkshire. He is a member of the West Riding County Football Association.

Career
Born in Sunderland, Moss grew up as a keen footballer and won a football scholarship at Central Connecticut State University in the United States but completed his studies with a degree in teaching and physical education at the University of Leeds. He played junior football at academy level, firstly for his hometown club Sunderland and then for Millwall, but stopped as travelling to the London club interfered with his studies.

Moss began taking refereeing courses as part of his A-level physical education studies. Although he qualified as a referee in 1988 he did not fully focus on his refereeing until he stopped playing football in 1999. Moss was employed by the Westbrook Lane Primary School in Leeds as a physical education teacher, where he taught future Premier League midfielder James Milner; Milner was later shown a red card by Moss in a Premier League match in 2019.

After progressing through the Northern Counties East League and Northern Premier League, Moss was promoted to the National Group of assistant referees in 2003. He was appointed to referee the 2005 Conference play-off final between Carlisle United and Stevenage Borough. He was then promoted to the National Group of Referees who officiate in the Football League; his first game was between Shrewsbury and Rochdale.

Moss became a regular official in the Football League and was appointed to a Premier League contest in December 2010 between Wigan Athletic and Aston Villa, however it was postponed due to heavy snow. He was later appointed to Birmingham City's visit to Blackpool in January 2011. Moss had been promoted to the list of Select Group Referees, who officiate all Premier League matches, for the 2011–12 season alongside fellow newly promoted referee Neil Swarbrick. He was the referee for the 2015 FA Cup Final between Arsenal and Aston Villa.

On 17 April 2016, following a 2–2 draw between Leicester City and West Ham United, Moss' refereeing decisions during the match were heavily scrutinized, with Alan Shearer noting the "inconsistencies were mind-boggling". On 4 February 2018, Moss drew criticism for his refereeing decisions in a Premier League match between Liverpool and Tottenham Hotspur, which ended in a 2–2 draw. Moss was seen on camera asking fourth official Martin Atkinson if there was "anything from TV", even though VAR was not in operation, before he decided to award Tottenham a penalty. During stoppage time, Moss consulted with assistant referee Eddie Smart to clarify if Harry Kane had been offside before awarding Tottenham another penalty. The Professional Game Match Officials Limited admitted that Moss was "misguided" to ask the fourth official for help using television when awarding Tottenham's first penalty, but defended his decisions.

Moss retired from refereeing at the end of the 2021-22 season and took up a new role of Select Group 1 Manager at the PGMOL

Statistics

Statistics are for all competitions. No records are available prior to 2005–06.

References

External links
Refworld Profile 

1970 births
Living people
English football referees
Sportspeople from Sunderland
People from Horsforth
Sportspeople from Leeds
FA Cup Final referees
Premier League referees